Donald Elliott Flanagan (born November 29, 1943) is an American retired basketball coach. From 1995 to 2011, Flanagan was head coach of the University of New Mexico women's basketball team.

Early life and college education
Born in Cambridge, Massachusetts and raised in the Mayberry Village community of New Hartford, Connecticut, Flanagan graduated from Cornwall Academy after attending East Hartford High School for three years and earned a basketball scholarship to Hartwick College, but he dropped out after one year.

Flanagan worked in Hartford before moving to Durango, Colorado to enroll at Fort Lewis College in 1967. Flanagan graduated from Fort Lewis in 1971 with a double major in elementary education and physical education. Flanagan played at guard for the Fort Lewis Skyhawks, then an NAIA program; he averaged 13.8 points and 5.3 rebounds in his junior season of 1969–70.

Coaching career
Flanagan began his coaching career in 1971 as boys' varsity basketball coach at Coronado High School in Gallina, New Mexico; he also coached cross country and baseball there. In 1973, Flanagan returned to Connecticut to coach at Pawcatuck Middle School in Pawcatuck, Connecticut. At Pawcatabuck, Flanagan had a 15–0 season. Flanagan returned to the Southwest in 1975 as boys' varsity basketball coach at Window Rock High School in Fort Defiance, Arizona. Window Rock went 75–25 and made the state tournament every year under Flanagan, including as state runner-up in 1978.

From 1979 to 1995, Flanagan was the girls' basketball head coach at Eldorado High School in Albuquerque, New Mexico, where he had a record of 401–13 and 11 New Mexico Activities Association Class 4A championships for the years 1980, 1981, 1983, 1984, 1986, 1987, 1989, 1990, 1992, 1993, and 1995. Flanagan was inducted into the Albuquerque Sports Hall of Fame in 1997.

As women's basketball coach at the University of New Mexico, Flanagan coached 508 collegiate games, which as of March 7, 2014, is a feat no coach has done in New Mexico basketball history. As of March 2014, he holds the title of most wins by any coach, men's or women's, at the school with 340 victories.  He passed former UNM Men's Basketball coach Dave Bliss's 246 wins on December 9, 2006. From 1998 to 2010, Flanagan's teams made the NCAA tournament or Women's National Invitation Tournament (WNIT) every year. Flanagan's New Mexico teams made seven NCAA Tournaments and six WNITs.

On April 4, 2011, Flanagan announced his resignation, following a 13–18 season and with a year remaining on his contract. He finished his coaching career with the Lobos with a record of 340 wins to 168 losses. Prior to his resignation, five freshmen players left the team. Flanagan responded: "It wasn't fair to the program for me to stay and try to recruit multiple players with one year left on my contract." With that resignation, Flanagan retired from coaching. Assistant coach Yvonne Sanchez, who had been an assistant coach under Flanagan since 2000, succeeded Flanagan as head coach on April 22, 2011.

Head coaching record

Sources:
WAC standings:
MW standings:
Postseason results:

References

1943 births
Living people
American women's basketball coaches
Basketball coaches from Connecticut
Basketball coaches from Massachusetts
Basketball players from Connecticut
Basketball players from Massachusetts
Fort Lewis Skyhawks men's basketball players
High school basketball coaches in the United States
New Mexico Lobos women's basketball coaches
People from New Hartford, Connecticut
Sportspeople from Cambridge, Massachusetts
American men's basketball players
Guards (basketball)